De Lannoy or Delannoy is a surname, and may refer to;
Noble Belgian House of Lannoy
 Jean de Lannoy
 Baldwin of Lannoy
 Hugo van Lannoy
 Guillebert de Lannoy, soldier, traveller and diplomat
 Charles de Lannoy, 1st Prince of Sulmona: soldier and statesman
 Philip de Lannoy, Prince of Sulmona, military leader
 Countess Stéphanie de Lannoy, now the Hereditary Grand Duchess of Luxembourg
Others
 Albert Delannoy, long jumper
 Colinet de Lannoy, composer
 Eustachius De Lannoy, naval commander
 Henri Delannoy (1833–1915), French military officer and amateur mathematician
 Jean Delannoy, actor and film director
 Louis De Lannoy, cyclist
 , writer and philosopher
 Marcel Delannoy (1898–1962), French composer
 Claire Delannoy, French writer
 Robert Delannoy, World War I flying ace

See also
Delano family
 Delannoy numbers, a mathematical sequence named after Henri Delannoy
 Delaunay
 Delone (disambiguation)
 Lannoy (disambiguation)

French-language surnames